The canton of Romilly-sur-Seine is an administrative division of the Aube department, northeastern France. It was created at the French canton reorganisation which came into effect in March 2015. Its seat is in Romilly-sur-Seine.

It consists of the following communes:
Crancey
Gélannes
Maizières-la-Grande-Paroisse
Pars-lès-Romilly
Romilly-sur-Seine
Saint-Hilaire-sous-Romilly

References

Cantons of Aube